Shane Johnson (born December 11, 1989) is an American soccer player.

Career

Youth and College
Johnson played soccer at Longwood University in Farmville, Virginia, where he started 70 matches and was named to the NSCAA Soccer Scholar All-East Region second team and was a first team All-Atlantic Soccer Conference honoree.

In 2011, Johnson played with Real Maryland Monarchs of the USL Premier Development League.

Professional
Johnson signed with the Richmond Kickers on March 9, 2012, and began the 2012 season as one of the starting central defenders, playing every minute in the first eight games. Johnson re-signed with the Kickers for the 2013 season on October 1, 2012.

Midway through the 2014 season, Johnson joined the Harrisburg City Islanders on loan. After only  making two appearances for Harrisburg in 2014, Johnson returned on loan for the 2015 season where he became a regular starter for the Islanders. During the 2016 season, Johnson fully signed on with Harrisburg.

References

External links
Longwood University bio

1989 births
Living people
American soccer players
Real Maryland F.C. players
Richmond Kickers players
Penn FC players
Association football defenders
Soccer players from Virginia
USL League Two players
USL Championship players
People from Ashburn, Virginia